The Fournier RF-3 is a single-seat motor glider designed by René Fournier and first flown in 1960.

Design and development

Fournier produced the Volkswagen-powered RF-1 single-seat motor-glider with a high-aspect ratio low-mounted wing, registered F-WJGX it first flew on 6 July 1960. Fournier followed it with an improved variant, the RF-2 using a Rectimo AR.1200 engine, the first of two-built, with the help of Centre Est, first flew in June 1962. 

Fournier started a company Societé Alpavia to manufacture a production variant of the RF-2, named the RF-3. The first RF-3 was exhibited at the June 1963 Paris Air Show. Series production commenced later that year. 

An aerobatic variant with a strengthened airframe was produced as the Fournier RF 4.

Variants
RF-1
Prototype Avions Planeur first flown in 1960, one built.
RF-2
Improved variant, first flown in 1962, two built.
RF-3
Production variant first flown in 1963, 89 built by Alpavia at Gap-Tallard.

Specifications (RF-3)

References

External links

1960s French sailplanes
Fournier aircraft
Motor gliders
Single-engined tractor aircraft
Low-wing aircraft
Aircraft first flown in 1963